The Sri Lanka women's national field hockey team represents Sri Lanka at international field hockey competitions for women. Sri Lanka is currently ranked under 40 FIH rating.July 2017 FIH Ratings The women's team was eligible to contest in the Women's FIH Hockey World League for the first time in its history after making its first appearance in the 2016–17 Women's FIH Hockey World League. Sri Lanka competed in the Round 1 (Asian category) of the Hockey World League for the season 2016-17 and they were knocked out of the first round claiming only 2 wins out of 6 pool matches.

Sri Lankan women's field hockey team also secured a silver medal in the field hockey competition which was part of the 2016 South Asian Games after losing to favourites India in the finals by a huge margin. It was also the first ever women's field hockey tournament to have contested in the South Asian Games.

In 2003, Sri Lankan women team also won a silver medal in the AHF Women's field hockey tournament.

Tournament record

Asian Games
 2022 – Qualified

Asia Cup
2004 – 8th
2009 – 11th

AHF Cup
1997 – 4th
2003 – 
2012 – 4th
2016 – 6th

Hockey World League

South Asian Games

References 

National team
Asian women's national field hockey teams
Field hockey